Pterostilbene (trans-3,5-dimethoxy-4-hydroxystilbene)  is a stilbenoid chemically related to resveratrol. In plants, it serves a defensive phytoalexin role.

Natural occurrence 
Pterostilbene is found in almonds, various Vaccinium berries (including blueberries), grape leaves and vines, and Pterocarpus marsupium heartwood.

Safety and regulation
Pterostilbene is considered to be a corrosive substance, is dangerous upon exposure to the eyes, and is an environmental toxin, especially to aquatic life. 
A randomized, double-blind, placebo-controlled of healthy human subjects given pterostilbene for 6–8 weeks, showed pterostilbene to be safe for human use at dosages up to 250 mg per day.

Its chemical relative, resveratrol, received FDA GRAS status in 2007, and approval of synthetic resveratrol as a safe compound by the European Food Safety Authority (EFSA) in 2016. Pterostilbene differs from resveratrol by exhibiting increased bioavailability (80% compared to 20% in resveratrol) due to the presence of two methoxy groups which cause it to exhibit increased lipophilic and oral absorption.

Research
Pterostilbene is being studied in laboratory and preliminary clinical research.

See also 
 Piceatannol, a stilbenoid related to both resveratrol and pterostilbene

References 

Nutrients
Stilbenoids
Phytoalexins